Subcancilla attenuata is a species of sea snail, a marine gastropod mollusk in the family Mitridae, the miters or miter snails.

Description

Distribution

References

 Broderip, W. J. (1836). Shells of the genus Mitra, Lam., and one species of Conoelix, Swains., forming part of the collection of Mr. Cuming. Proceedings of the Zoological Society of London. 1835: 192-198
 Keen, A. M. 1971. Sea Shells of Tropical West America. Marine mollusks from Baja California to Peru, ed. 2. Stanford University Press. xv, 1064 pp., 22 pls. 
 Cernohorsky W. O. (1991). The Mitridae of the world (Part 2). Monographs of Marine Mollusca 4.

Mitridae
Gastropods described in 1836
Taxa named by William Broderip